Pehchaan 3D is the first Punjabi 3D movie based on a true story.

Synopsis
"Jagjot Sidhu, a young medicine graduate, has aspirations to soon become a doctor and make his family proud. After witnessing a murder, he comes forward to testify against a corrupt family. His life, appearance, relationships, career and identity are taken away for his own protection. Life takes him on a trip filled with anger, laughter, religion, love and betrayal all centered around the man he actually is. He must get back his life and somehow get home."

The film had its Worldwide Premiere at sold-out shows at the South Asian Film Festival Canada 2012. The film was very well received.

Cast
Steve Dhillon as Jagjot Sidhu
Manjit Bath as Harmesh Rai
Karam Batth as Sunny
Erika Virk as Neetu Sidhu
Robin Jawanda as Manpreet Sidhu
Gurdip Bhullar as Darshan Sidhu
Kabir Brar as Armaan Sidhu
Sukhwinder Takhar as Avtar Singh
Gurnam Thandi as Mr. Gill
Darshpreet Cambo as Inspector Kam Bajwa
Nevin Chandra as Club DJ

Reception
Ballewood.in praises Pehchaan 3D for an unusual plot, good direction and brilliant performances. The reviewer says,"Pehchaan 3D- World’s first ever 3D Punjabi feature film, stands tall above the common herd of clichéd Punjabi movies, not just because it’s a 3D movie, but also, because of its unusual storyline, brilliant acting, great direction and outstanding music." On the downside, "The lack of promotion and the fact that nobody in India knows anything about the cast of the movie, would definitely act as deterrents. Therefore, the film will require a very strong word of mouth marketing to find a foothold at the box office."

See also
 List of 3D films
 List of Indian Punjabi films after 2011

References

External links
 

Indian 3D films
Punjabi-language Indian films
2010s Punjabi-language films